Paşalar can refer to:

 Paşalar, Akçakoca
 Paşalar, Mustafakemalpaşa, Turkey
 Paşalar, Shusha, Azerbaijan